A Federal Minister for Special Affairs is a member of the German government without portfolio.

Early Minister for Special Affairs were assigned different tasks by the Chancellor. For example, Robert Tillmanns, one of the first two Ministers for Special Affairs, represented the federal government in the Council of Elders of the Bundestag. Other responsibilities delegated to different Ministers for Special Affairs included the middle class, water management, the Federal Defense Council or the affairs of the Vice-Chancellor of Germany.

Since 1964, this use of the title fell out of favour. Instead, the title is often given to the Chief of staff of the Chancellery to provide him with a vote in cabinet meetings. The last Chief of staff of the Chancellery not to concurrently hold the title of minister special affairs was Frank-Walter Steinmeier (1999–2005), who instead retained the lower Secretary of State rank; however regardless of ministerial rank, the title "Kanzleramtsminister" (Minister of the Chancellery) is frequently used to refer to the job. Historically, appointees to the ministry who weren't heads of the chancellery at the same time have often been important political aides or politicians waiting for a portfolio or representatives of certain parties, groups or regions. 

For instance, after German reunification in 1990, some members of the final East German government, former Association of Free Democrats (the affiliated group of the FDP, the then-junior coalition partner) Volkskammer leader Rainer Ortleb and President of the Volkskammer Sabine Bergmann-Pohl were appointed as Federal Ministers for Special Affairs, in order to provide a representation of the New states of Germany in the federal government.

List of Federal Ministers for Special Affairs 
Political Party:

Special Affairs